Deysbrook Barracks was a regular army barracks in West Derby in Liverpool. The barracks was used by 59th (Volunteers) Signal Squadron of the Royal Signals until around 2000.

Today
The last remains of the barracks are a few houses that were part of the quarters.

References

Former buildings and structures in Liverpool